Nalanda Maha Vidyalaya is a co-educational school in the Elpitiya division, Galle district, Sri Lanka. It provides education for around 1,000 students in grades 1 to 13, with a staff of about 50 teachers in the primary and secondary schools.

The school was founded after the Japanese dropped bombs on Colombo 5 April 1942.

The current principals are G. A. Somadasa and A. H. Siripala.

See also
Nalanda Maha Vidyalaya Colombo

National schools in Sri Lanka
Buddhist schools in Sri Lanka
Buildings and structures in Elpitiya
Schools in Galle District